While the Sun Shines is a 1947 British comedy film directed by Anthony Asquith and starring Barbara White, Ronald Squire, Brenda Bruce, Bonar Colleano, and Michael Allan. It was based on Terence Rattigan's 1943 play of the same name.

Plot
Lady Elisabeth Randall is an English Air Force corporal during World War II. She is on her way to marry her fiancé when she finds herself being romanced by two different men. The first man is Colbert, a Frenchman residing in England. The second man is Joe Mulvaney, an American lieutenant. Difficulties ensue as Lady Elisabeth finds that due to these romances both her military career and her impending marriage are in danger.

Cast

Critical reception
TV Guide wrote that "The direction never convinces the viewer that this story was meant to be told anywhere but on the stage"; and in his book Anthony Asquith, Tom Ryall noted that the film "reflected the tone though not the success of its stage predecessor."

References

External links

1947 films
1947 comedy films
British black-and-white films
Films directed by Anthony Asquith
British comedy films
Films with screenplays by Terence Rattigan
Films with screenplays by Anatole de Grunwald
Films produced by Anatole de Grunwald
1940s English-language films
1940s British films